Françoise Thom (born 1951) is a French historian and Sovietologist, honorary lecturer in contemporary history at Paris-Sorbonne University. A specialist in post-communist Russia, she is the author of works of political analysis on the country and its leaders.

Early life and education
Françoise Thom was born in Strasbourg, 1951. Her parents are René Thom, a mathematician known for his theory of catastrophes and winner of the Fields Medal, and of Suzanne Helmlinger. Françoise has two siblings, Elizabeth and Christian.

Thom has a degree in Russian.

Career
She lived for three years in the Soviet Union, then taught Russian in secondary schools in Ferney-Voltaire and Calais. She is a research associate at the Institut français de polémologie. In 1983, she defended a thesis entitled , directed by Alain Besançon at the School for Advanced Studies in the Social Sciences.

She was then appointed lecturer in contemporary history at Paris-Sorbonne University.

She published her thesis in a book entitled, in 1987.

In 1998, she co-authored, with Jean Foyer, Jacques Julliard, and Jean-Pierre Thiollet, the book, La Pensée unique - Le vrai procès. She collected, translated, prefaced and annotated the memoirs and analyses of Sergo Beria, son of Lavrentiy Beria, published in 1999 under the title . In 2013, she finally published a biography of Beria, under the title . In 2018, she published Comprendre le poutinisme (Understanding Putinism), in which she recalls Vladimir Putin's former membership in the KGB and studies the "propaganda of Russian power".

Personal life
In April 2005, she married historian Georges Mamoulia.

Selected works

Books
 L'École des barbares, with Isabelle Stal, Paris, Julliard, 1985
 La langue de bois, Paris, Julliard, 1987
 Les fins du communisme, Paris, Critérion, 1994
 Le Moment Gorbatchev, Paris, Hachette, 1989
 Beria : Le Janus du Kremlin, Paris, Cerf, 2013 924 p. 
 Géopolitique de la Russie, with Jean-Sylvestre Mongrenier, Paris, PUF, collection "Que sais-je?", 2016
 Comprendre le poutinisme, Paris/Perpignan, Desclée De Brouwer, 2018, 240 p. 
 La Marche à rebours. Regards sur l’histoire soviétique et russe, Paris, Sorbonne Université Presses, collection "Mondes contemporains", 2021, 724 p. 
 Poutine ou l'obsession de la puissance, Litos, 2022, 248 p.

Articles
 "Les Occidentaux devant la fin de l’Union soviétique", Commentaire, no 118, February 2007, pp. 373-382
 "Le parti russe en France", Commentaire, February 2016, pp. 432-436

Editor
 Beria, Sergo, Beria, mon père : au cœur du pouvoir stalinien, Plon/Critérion, 1999, 448 p.

References

1951 births
Living people
People from Strasbourg
20th-century French historians
21st-century French historians
Historians of Russia
Paris-Sorbonne University alumni
Historians of communism
Academic staff of Paris-Sorbonne University